Presidential elections were held in Slovakia in March 2019. Incumbent President Andrej Kiska did not run for a second term.

Fifteen candidates contested the first round on 16 March, of which two later formally withdrew their bids before voting took place, but their names still had to remain on the ballot papers. Zuzana Čaputová of the Progressive Slovakia party finished ahead of the other candidates, receiving 40.6% of the votes, but failed to achieve the necessary threshold of 50%+1 vote from all registered voters to avoid a run-off. Maroš Šefčovič, the Vice-President of the European Commission for the Energy Union, who was running as an independent supported by the Direction – Social Democracy (SMER–SD) party, came in as the runner-up with 18.7% of the vote and earned a place in the run-off as well.

In the second round on 30 March, Čaputová was elected with 58.4% of the vote to Šefčovič's 41.6%. She became the first woman to be elected to the presidency and became Slovakia's youngest-ever president upon her inauguration which took place on 15 June 2019.

Background 
Andrej Kiska was elected President in March 2014. He won the run-off with a large majority against then-Prime minister Robert Fico.

Polls indicated that he was Slovakia's most trusted politician and that he would have likely been the frontrunner in the election, had he chosen to present himself as a candidate. He had originally planned to announce whether he would run for a second term in September 2018. but moved it on 15 May 2018. Freedom and Solidarity had announced it would support Kiska's candidacy. However, Kiska announced on 15 May 2018 that he would not run for re-election, arguing that this move might end "the era of political confrontation" his country faced and citing a desire to spend more time with his family. Kiska is notably pro-European.

Kiska's decision had been rumoured since February 2018 and political parties had already started to look for candidates.
 The socially and economically liberal party Freedom and Solidarity was speculated to nominate Robert Mistrík. He later withdrew.
 Veronika Remišová of the Christian-Democrat Ordinary People and Independent Personalities polled at 7.9% of the vote.
 Andrej Danko of the Slovak National Party polled at 13%.
 The anti-immigration party We Are Family had its candidate selected in May 2018.
 The governing coalition's biggest party Smer-SD, as of May 2018 still lacked a candidate. In January 2019, it was announced that the party candidate would be Maroš Šefčovič.
 The far-right Kotleba-ĽSNS nominated its leader Marian Kotleba on 31 May 2018.
 The centre-right Hungarian minority party Most-Híd nominated its leader Béla Bugár on 9 June 2018.

Electoral system
The President of the Slovak Republic has been elected for a five-year term, and by popular vote since the elections in 1999. Its role is limited, but not just ceremonial. The President has the power to nominate the Prime Minister, to veto bills (unless confirmed by a two-thirds majority), and to nominate judges on the highest tiers of the judicial branch.

The President is elected through a two-round method; if no candidate reaches 50%+1 votes in the first round, the top two candidates of the first round take part in a second round.

For a candidacy to be valid, the Constitution of Slovakia requires the collection of 15,000 signatures of Slovak citizens, or the support of 15 of the 150 MPs in the legislature. The candidate must be an eligible voter over 40 years old, must resign from any other conflicting public office, and is limited to two terms in office.

Candidates
Candidates who claimed 15,000 citizen signatures or have 15 MP signatures by midnight of 31 January 2019 were as follows:

Declined to run
 Andrej Kiska, 4th President
 Robert Fico, Former Prime Minister
 Peter Pellegrini, Then-Prime Minister
 Miroslav Lajčák, Minister of Foreign Affairs
 Iveta Radičová, Former Prime Minister
 Andrej Danko, Speaker of the National Council of Slovak Republic
 Boris Kollár, Member of Parliament and leader of We Are Family
 Imrich Béreš, Former Member of Parliament
 Marek Maďarič, Former Minister of Culture

Withdrawn
Oskar Fegyveres, a witness in the kidnapping of Michal Kováč Jr., decided to endorse František Mikloško
Gabriela Drobová, CEO & founder of FashionTV, former presenter and producer on Markíza
József Menyhárt, leader of the Party of the Hungarian Community, decided to endorse Robert Mistrík
Robert Mistrík, researcher, entrepreneur and co-founder of SaS, decided to endorse Zuzana Čaputová

Campaign
During the campaign, Šefčovič (a Roman Catholic) spoke against any changes in LGBT rights status in Slovakia, strongly opposing both civil partnerships or same-sex adoptions. He criticised his opponent Čaputová (who is in favour of both) as a candidate who is forcing a "new ultraliberal agenda" on Slovakia, comparing the second round of elections to a referendum on such an agenda, which he considers to be "in exact contradiction to traditional Christian values". He also stated that "we can not support any further steps towards civil unions or same-sex adoptions because these would go precisely against our traditional Christian values", calling this stance as his "very natural position" due to his Christianity. According to his opinion, discussions about "such experiments bring great unrest to society".

Šefčovič has also criticised his opponent Čaputová for her opinions on the European migrant crisis and related policies. He asserted the importance of a speedy deportation policy, so that "people who do not have any business here are sent to their home countries as quickly as possible". Furthermore, he argued out that "it has to be Slovaks who decide who comes to our country".

Štefan Harabin ran on a platform of "traditional Slovak culture based on Christianity and family, formed by a man–father and woman–mother" and rejecting "gender ideology".

During the campaign Harabin accused Muslim migrants of "killing and raping European women in Germany and France" and claimed his opponents wanted to destroy Slovak culture. He also condemned NATO, European Union institutions as well as homosexuals. According to Globsec, Harabin was the most favoured candidate by "pro-Kremlin disinformation channels" on Facebook, receiving 174 positive and no negative posts.

Opinion polls

First round

Second round

Čaputová vs Harabin

Šefčovič vs Harabin

Šefcovič vs Mistrík

Mistrík vs Harabin

Kiska's Second term
This lists polls that asked people if they want Andrej Kiska as president for Second term.

Results

Zuzana Čaputová of the Progressive Slovakia party finished far ahead of the other candidates, receiving 40.6% of the votes, but failed to achieve the necessary threshold of 50%+1 vote from all registered voters to avoid a run-off. Maroš Šefčovič, the Vice-President of the European Commission for the Energy Union, who was running as an independent supported by the governing Smer-SD, was the runner-up with 18.7% of the vote and earned the other place in the run-off. Voter turnout in the first round was 48.74%, the highest percentage for that stage of presidential elections since direct voting for the position was introduced in 1999.

In the second round, Čaputová won election to the presidency, garnering 58.4% of the vote to Šefčovič's 41.6%. She became the first woman to be elected to the position and became Slovakia's youngest-ever president upon her inauguration on 15 June 2019. The second round turnout of just 41.80% was the lowest for any round of presidential elections in Slovakia. The number of votes with which Čaputová was elected to office is also the lowest for any directly elected Slovak president to date.

References

Slovakia
Presidential
Slovakia
Presidential elections in Slovakia